New River Shasta is an extinct Shastan language formerly spoken in northern California. It may have had only 300 speakers before contact, and they soon went extinct; the language is attested in only a few short wordlists. Kroeber regarded them as possibly "nearest to the major group in speech, although [...] their tongue as a whole must have been unintelligible to the Shasta proper."

References

Sources

External links
Overview at the Survey of California and Other Indian Languages 

Shastan languages
Extinct languages of North America
Indigenous languages of California